Martin Andjaba (born 17 December 1957 in Onhokolo) is a Namibian diplomat and politician.  Namibia's ambassador to Germany.

Career
Andjaba served as the Namibian government's Chief of Protocol since 1990. He became Permanent representative to the United Nations on 4 September 1996. During Namibia's two-year tenure on the United Nations Security Council, Andjaba served as President of the Security Council in August 1999 and October 2000. He also led a UN delegation to East Timor.

In 2010 Andjaba was appointed ambassador to the United States of America. He held this position until April 2018 when he was appointed Minister of Presidential Affairs. In July 2019, with the next parliamentary election only months away, Andjaba became acting minister of Education, Arts and Culture, replacing Katrina Hanse-Himarwa. In March 2020, Anna Nghipondoka took over this portfolio. Andjaba was appointed ambassador to Germany at the end of that year.

Recognition
Andjaba was conferred the Most Distinguished Order of Namibia: Second Class on Heroes' Day 2014.

References

1957 births
Living people
Namibian diplomats
SWAPO politicians
Government ministers of Namibia
Permanent Representatives of Namibia to the United Nations
Ambassadors of Namibia to the United States
Ambassadors of Namibia to Germany